The World Wrestling Network was a National Wrestling Alliance-affiliated professional wrestling promotion which was owned by promoter Jim Crockett, Jr., his last attempt to rebuild a national wrestling promotion after selling Jim Crockett Promotions to Ted Turner in 1988. As part of a non-compete clause in the agreement he signed with Turner, Crockett was unable to promote professional wrestling events for three years.

History
In 1993, Crockett began contacting former World Championship Wrestling and World Wrestling Federation veterans such as Road Warrior Hawk, Jake "The Snake" Roberts and Paul Heyman. Heyman, who had recently left on bad terms with WCW, eventually became head booker for the promotion although he and Crockett would eventually part ways due to his commitments to then Eastern Championship Wrestling and ECW's eventual breakaway from the National Wrestling Alliance.

Holding its first event in Killeen, Texas in August 1993, the show proved moderately successful with 2,156 in attendance. The following year, the promotion held its first televised event at the Manhattan Center in New York City on February 28, 1994 which featured Road Warrior Hawk and Jake Roberts as well as Public Enemy, Sabu, Terry Funk, Shane Douglas and Missy Hyatt in her first appearance since being fired by WCW.

Both Crockett and Heyman had hoped to provide a unique concept of producing televised matches in high-definition television via internet broadcast, using much of ECW's television production and other resources to do so (this is one of the reasons that Eddie Gilbert resigned his position as head booker and left the promotion in September 1993), however, the event was the only HDTV-television taping broadcast and eventually Crockett closed the promotion by the end of the year.

World Wrestling Network in New York 

On February 28, 1994, the World Wrestling Network carried out a television taping in the Manhattan Center in New York City, New York in the United States. The event featured multiple World Championship Wrestling and World Wrestling Federation alumni as well as wrestlers from Paul Heyman's Eastern Championship Wrestling promotion.

Event 
During the event, Shane Douglas (accompanied by Missy Hyatt and multiple cheerleaders) gave a promo in which he declared he would be the inaugural World Wrestling Network Heavyweight Champion.

The main event was a single match between Sabu and Terry Funk which ended in a double disqualification. The bout saw multiple spectacles, including  Funk throwing Sabu into a dumpster and pushing it around the Manhattan Center; Sabu dismantling a concession stand and then moonsaulting through the table; Funk breaking a glass bottle; and the two men brawling into the audience.

Results

References

Further reading

Entertainment companies established in 1993
Companies disestablished in 1994
American professional wrestling promotions
National Wrestling Alliance members